Huaulu is a language of Seram, Indonesia.

External links

Central Maluku languages
Languages of Indonesia
Seram Island